Hello Tomorrow is the ninth studio album by saxophone player Dave Koz. It was his first album released by Concord Records on  October 19, 2010. Koz himself provided vocals on "This Guy's in Love with You". The album peaked at number 1 on Billboard Jazz Albums chart. on November 30, 2011, the album received a Nomination in 54th Grammy Awards for Best Pop Instrumental Album.

Track listing

Personnel 
 Dave Koz – alto saxophone, soprano saxophone, tenor saxophone, vocals (5), whisper, keyboards, piano
 Tim Carmon – Fender Rhodes, Wurlitzer electric piano
 David Delhomme – keyboards, synthesizers 
 Harvey Mason, Jr. – keyboards, programming 
 Greg Phillinganes – keyboards, acoustic piano, Fender Rhodes 
 Darren Rahn – keyboards, programming 
 Nate Harasim – keyboards, synthesizer programming, loops
 Bobby Sparks II – Hammond B3 organ
 Marcus Miller – keyboards, Moog synthesizer, guitars, bass guitar, vibraphone, bass clarinet, clarinet, backing vocals, arrangements, horn arrangements 
 Brian Culbertson – keyboards (9), synthesizers (9), bass programming (9), trombone (9)
 Jeff Lorber – keyboards (11), acoustic piano solo (11)
 Lee Ritenour – guitar (1)
 John Burk – guitars
 Paul Jackson, Jr. – guitars
 Ray Parker Jr. – guitars
 Dean Parks – guitars, arrangements 
 John "Jubu" Smith – guitars 
 Jonathan Butler – guitar (4), vocals (4)
 Keb' Mo' – guitar (7, 9), vocals (7, 9)
 Omar Hakim – drums
 John Robinson – drums
 Lenny Castro – percussion
 Sheila E. – percussion, vocals (4)
 Dan Higgins – flute, tenor saxophone 
 Boney James – tenor saxophone (2)
 Chuck Findley – trombone, trumpet
 Alan Kaplan – trombone
 Gary Grant – trumpet
 Herb Alpert – trumpet (5)
 Christian Scott – trumpet (9)
 Brian O'Connor – French Horn
 John Capek – strings, string arrangements 
 Lynne Fiddmont – backing vocals
 Lynn Mabry – backing vocals
 Evan Rogers – backing vocals
 Dana Glover – vocals (8)

Charts

References

Dave Koz albums
2010 albums
Concord Records albums
Instrumental albums